Dave de Meij (born 3 July 2001) is a Dutch professional footballer who plays as a forward for Blauw Geel '38.

Career
Born in Helmond, De Meij played youth football for VV Bruheze, FC Eindhoven, Helmond Sport and VV Gemert, before returning to the Eindhoven academy. He made his professional debut for the club on 13 December 2019 as a second-half substitute in a 2–2 draw in the Eerste Divisie against Jong FC Utrecht.

On 12 June 2022, de Meij signed with fourth-tier Derde Divisie club Blauw Geel '38.

Career statistics

References

External links
 
 

Living people
2001 births
Sportspeople from Helmond
Dutch footballers
Association football midfielders
Helmond Sport players
FC Eindhoven players
Blauw Geel '38 players
Eerste Divisie players
Footballers from North Brabant